Sichuan Gymnasium is a transfer station on Line 1 and Line 3 of the Chengdu Metro in China. It serves the nearby Sichuan Provincial Gymnasium.

Station layout

Gallery

References

Railway stations in Sichuan
Railway stations in China opened in 2010
Chengdu Metro stations